Andrew Russell Pearson (December 13, 1897 – September 1, 1969) was an American columnist, noted for his syndicated newspaper column "Washington Merry-Go-Round". He also had a program on NBC Radio titled Drew Pearson Comments. He was known for his approach towards high level politicians, such as senators, cabinet members, generals and American presidents.

Early life and career
Pearson was born in Evanston, Illinois, to Quaker parents Paul Martin Pearson, an English professor at Northwestern University, and Edna Rachel Wolfe Pearson. When Pearson was 6 years old, his father joined the faculty of Swarthmore College as professor of public speaking, and the family moved to Pennsylvania, joining the Society of Friends, with which the college was then affiliated. After being educated at Phillips Exeter Academy, Pearson attended Swarthmore from 1915 until 1919, where he edited its student newspaper, The Phoenix.

From 1919 to 1921, Pearson served with the American Friends Service Committee, directing postwar rebuilding operations in Peć, which at that time was part of Serbia. From 1921 to 1922, he lectured in geography at the University of Pennsylvania.

In 1923 Pearson traveled to Japan, China, New Zealand, Australia, India, and Serbia, and persuaded several newspapers to buy articles about his travels. He was also commissioned by the American "Around the World Syndicate" to produce a set of interviews entitled "Europe's Twelve Greatest Men".

In 1924, he taught industrial geography at Columbia University.

From 1925 to 1928, Pearson continued reporting on international events, including strikes in China, the Geneva Naval Conference, the Pan-American Conference in Havana, and the signing of the Kellogg-Briand Pact in Paris.

In 1929 he became the Washington correspondent for The Baltimore Sun. However, in 1931 and 1932, with Robert S. Allen, he anonymously published a book called Washington Merry-Go-Round and its sequel. When the Sun discovered Pearson had co-authored these books, he was promptly fired. Late in 1932, Pearson and Allen secured a contract with the Scripps–Howard syndicate, United Features, to syndicate a column called "Washington Merry-Go-Round". It first appeared in Eleanor "Cissy" Patterson's Washington Herald on November 17, 1932. But as World War II escalated in Europe, Pearson's strong support of Franklin D. Roosevelt, in opposition to Patterson and the Herald isolationist position, led to an acrimonious termination of Pearson's and Allen's contract with the Herald. In 1941 The Washington Post picked up the contract for the "Washington Merry-Go-Round".

Radio, film, and other media
From 1935 to 1936, Allen and Pearson broadcast a 15-minute program twice a week on the Mutual Broadcasting System. They continued with a 30-minute music and news show, Listen America, in 1939–1940, ending this partnership in 1941. They also wrote a comic strip, Hap Hopper, Washington Correspondent, which was drawn from 1939 to 1943 by Jack Sparling, and from 1943 onward by Al Plastino.

Pearson continued alone on NBC with Drew Pearson Comments from 1941 to 1953 for a variety of sponsors (Serutan, Nutrex, Lee Hats, Adam Hats). His commentary was broadcast through 1968 on the now-defunct Intermountain Network.

In addition to radio, Pearson appeared in a number of Hollywood movies, such as the 1951 science fiction film The Day the Earth Stood Still and RKO's 1945 propaganda movie Betrayal from the East.

In the former film, Pearson (playing himself) is the only journalist who urges calm and restraint (versus the fear and paranoia evoked by his colleagues) while Washington is panicked by the escape of the alien visitor Klaatu.

In the latter movie, Pearson referred to an exposé that accused Japanese Americans of being part of a Japanese conspiracy to engage in acts of terrorism and espionage. The movie was based on the 1943 best-selling book Betrayal from the East: The Inside Story of Japanese Spies in America by Alan Hynd. Furthermore, Pearson appeared as himself in City Across the River (1949).

In 1952 and 1953, Pearson hosted The Drew Pearson Show on the ABC and DuMont Television networks.

On a January 8, 1950, broadcast of CBS Radio's The Jack Benny Program, Pearson was at the center of a notorious joke. Announcer Don Wilson was to say he heard Jack had bought a new suit on Drew Pearson's program, but misspoke Pearson's name: "Drear Pooson". Later in the show, comedic actor Frank Nelson was asked by Benny if he was the doorman. Nelson replied with a line surreptitiously given him by the show's writers, "Who do you think I am? Drear Pooson?"

"Washington Merry-Go-Round"
The "Merry-Go-Round" column started as a result of the Pearson's anonymous publication in 1931 of the book, Washington Merry-Go-Round, co-written with Robert Allen, the Washington bureau chief for The Christian Science Monitor. The book was a collection of muckraking news items concerning key figures in public life that challenged the journalistic code of the day. In 1932 it was followed by a second book, More Merry-Go-Round. Although they were exposed as the publishers and forced to resign their positions, Pearson and Allen were successful enough in their books to become co-authors of the syndicated column, the "Merry-Go-Round", that same year. Also in 1932, the original book was made into a film of the same name by Columbia Pictures, directed by James Cruze, and starring Lee Tracy and Constance Cummings.

According to his one-time partner, Jack Anderson, Pearson saw journalism as a means to challenge those he thought to be working against the public interest. He himself had the reputation of a person who put principles over profit. Refusing to carry libel insurance or having an agreement with his syndicate to finance libel judgments against him, his journalistic engagement resulted in more than 120 actions for libel, only in one case he had to pay a settlement.

During World War II, Pearson's column not only revealed embarrassing news items, but expanded to criticize the Roosevelt administration's conduct of the war, in particular U.S. foreign policy regarding Joseph Stalin and the Soviet Union. As a supporter of the Soviet Union's struggle against Nazi Germany, Pearson demanded that the Allied Command create a second front in Europe in 1943 to assist the Soviets. When Pearson's demands were not met, he began to openly criticize Secretary of State Cordell Hull, James Dunn, and other State Department officials, whom Pearson accused of hating Soviet Russia. After one of Pearson's more virulent columns accused Secretary of State Hull and his deputies of a conscious policy to "bleed Russia white", President Roosevelt convened a press conference in which he angrily accused Pearson of printing statements that were a lie "from beginning to end", jeopardizing United Nations unity, and committing an act of bad faith towards his own nation. The president concluded his statement by calling Pearson "a chronic liar".

Pearson was the first to report the 1943 incident of General George S. Patton's slapping of soldier Charles Kuhl. It was the first of two slapping-incidents, when General Patton, who denied the medical condition of combat stress reaction, struck and badly abused soldiers whom he had met during their evaluation at evacuation hospitals. Allied Headquarters denied that Patton had received either an official reprimand or a relief from combat duty, but confirmed that Patton had slapped a soldier with his gloves. Demands for Patton to be recalled and sent home soon arose in Congress as well as in newspaper articles and editorials across the country. However, public opinion was largely favorable to Patton. While Patton was later reassigned and his career advancement slowed, he was not relieved, but continued to serve in the European theater, where he would later command the U.S. Third Army. Pearson's broadcast and subsequent article on Patton's alleged behavior sufficiently raised the suspicions of Secretary of War Henry L. Stimson that he requested Army General Joseph T. McNarney to "put an inspector on the War Department to see who has been leaking out information. Pearson's articles are about three-quarters false but there's just a germ of truth in them that someone must have given him."

After Pearson reported that General Douglas MacArthur was actively campaigning for his own promotion, MacArthur sued Pearson for defamation, but dropped the suit after Pearson threatened to publish love letters from MacArthur to his Eurasian paramour, Isabel Rosario Cooper.

Post-war investigations
In February 1946, Pearson revealed the existence of a Canadian ring of Soviet spies who had given away secret information about the atomic bomb, and he hinted that the espionage scandal might extend to America as well. The government had kept the news under wraps for several months until Pearson broke the news in a series of radio broadcasts. It is possible that he was tipped off by a government official who wanted to turn American opinion against the Soviets, possibly even FBI director J. Edgar Hoover, according to historian Amy Knight.

He had a role in the downfall of U.S. Congressman John Parnell Thomas, Chairman of the House Committee on Un-American Activities, in 1948. After revelations in Pearson's column, Thomas was investigated and later convicted of conspiracy to defraud the government for hiring friends who never worked for him, then depositing their paychecks into his personal accounts. Pearson was a staunch opponent of the actions of Senator Joseph McCarthy and other attempts by Congress to investigate Soviet and communist influence in government and the media, and eagerly denounced the allegations by Senator McCarthy and the House Committee.

In May 1948, Pearson was among the journalists who reported on the business problems of Preston Tucker and his Tucker Corporation. Tucker, a former policeman of the prohibition aera, was a self-made car-designer and businessman. Struggeling to finance his high-flying plans in the design and safety of his cars, he had attempted "to raise money through unconventional means, including selling dealership rights for a car that didn't exist yet." When the U.S. Securities and Exchange Commission  (SEC) and Justice Department started to investigate the case in 1947, his first annual report, which he initially had refused to produce, resulted in a deficit of $ 5,651,208. Tucker took the news of the latest investigation to the newspapers, publishing full-page ads that read: "My associates and myself and the Tucker Corp. have been investigated time & again . . . Now once more we are being investigated." Although he was acquitted from fraud charges, Tucker's firm went bancrupt in 1950.

James Forrestal
Journalists, such as Drew Pearson and Walter Winchell, were criticized for their continuing critical reports about the US Secretary of Defence James V. Forrestal. Forrestal, whom President Harry S. Truman had forced to resign, had committed suicide during his stay at the psychiatric clinic of the U. S. Naval Hospital, Bethesda, Maryland. The suicide was followed by an investigation, that was intended to clarify controversial aspects of his treatment. Forrestal who had told his doctors about an earlier episode when he had tried to take his life, had been treated with Sodium amythal. After several weeks with this treatment, an insulin shock therapy followed. Both therapies resulted in strong overreactions: "From that time on he was carried with ten units of insulin before breakfast and another ten units before lunch with extra feedings in the afternoon and evening". His sleeplessness was treated with sedatives. In the course of the investigation, Forrestal's doctors had to explain, why the chief of psychiatrists who had been in charge of the patient, had been out of house at the time of his suicide, and why most of the patient's restrictments had been relieved. Other questions dealt with the fact, that a patient with a high risk of suicide had been placed in a room at the sixteenth floor of the tower of this hospital. The chief of psychiatrists came up with a colleague's concern "that the widespread publicity might in some way reflect upon the excellence of Navy psychiatry unless there is full understanding by everyone of necessary risks and hazards which must be faced courageously in the management of such a medical problem." His diagnosis was that Forrestal had been outworked due to his difficult professional obligations, and that he had suffered from his loss of office. Asking for a second opportunity to elaborate further his summary of what might have happened the night of the suicide, he only now hinted to a possible negative effect of some media reports on the mood of his patient. The investigation finally cleared the US Naval Hospital and its staff from suspicions and stated that its doctors and wards weren't responsible for Forrestal's death.

Speaking out against Senator McCarthy
In 1950, Pearson began the first in a series of columns attacking Senator Joseph McCarthy after McCarthy declared that he had a list of 205 people in the State Department that were members of the American Communist Party. Ironically, Pearson, through his associate Jack Anderson, had been using McCarthy as a confidential source for information on other politicians. Pearson used McCarthy's revelations in his columns with one exception – material on suspected Communists working in the U.S. government that McCarthy and his staff had uncovered. Over the next two months McCarthy made seven Senate speeches on Drew Pearson, calling for a "patriotic boycott" of his radio show which cost Pearson the sponsor of his radio show. Twelve newspapers cancelled their contract with Pearson.

In response, Senator McCarthy referred to Pearson's one-time assistant David Karr, born Katz, as "Pearson's  'KGB controller' and charged that 'Pearson's all-important job, which he did for the Party without fail, under the direction of David Karr, was to lead the character assassination of an man who was a threat to international communism. Karr had been exposed by the House Un-American Activities Committee in 1943 as having worked for two years on the staff of the Communist newspaper The Daily Worker. In response, Pearson claimed that Karr had only joined the Daily Worker because he had wanted to get into baseball games for free. Karr ostensibly covered home Yankee games for the Daily Worker, a paper not known for its sports readership, but his other activities remained unknown at the time. Years later, however, the release of the FBI's Venona decrypt of June 1944 revealed that Karr was an informational source for the NKVD. Another member of Pearson's staff, Andrew Older, along with his wife, was identified in 1951 as a Communist Party member in testimony before the Senate Internal Security Subcommittee. Older's sister, Julia Older, was also suspected of having spied for the Soviet Union. 

In December 1950 McCarthy and Pearson were involved in a public brawl at the Sulgrave Club in Washington, D.C. Pearson later sued McCarthy for injuries he allegedly received in the fight, which Pearson stated resulted from being "grabbed by the neck and kicked in the groin." The following month, McCarthy delivered a speech in the Senate in which he referred to Pearson as a "communist tool".

In October, 1953, Senator McCarthy began investigating communist infiltration into the military. McCarthy's attempts to discredit Robert Stevens, the Secretary of the Army, infuriated President Dwight Eisenhower, who instructed the Department of the Army to release information detrimental to McCarthy to journalists who were known to be opposed to him. On December 15, 1952, Pearson, working with Eisenhower's staff, published a column using the information on McCarthy, dealing him a significant blow.

Fight against politically motivated denunciation of Washington "homosexuals"

On October 19, 1964 Pearson published an article, with the title of "Homosexuality Bipartisan Problem Facing Washington". Here he presented several cases when members of the Washington administration and their sons were blackmailed, threatened and eased out of office on the basis of rumors that they were homosexuals. Arthur Vandenberg Jr., a talented Republican government official from Michigan, had lost the prospect of becoming president Ike Eisenhower's number 1 assistant; Senator Lester Hunt, Democrat of Wyoming, had taken his own life after Republican senators Styles Bridges of New Hampshire and Herman Welker of Idaho had threatened that they would reveal how his son had been arrested on a moral charge by Washington police. Pearson's article was a reaction to the political elimination of Walter Jenkins, longtime top aide and personal friend to Lyndon B. Johnson and his wife Lady Bird Johnson. On October 7, 1964, a month before the presidential election, Jenkins, a "stout catholic", husband and father of six children, had been arrested and charged with "disorderly conduct" with another man. The scandal was promoted to the press by members of the Republican party, who exploited the scandal in their own interests. Pearson, who called the "history of homosexuality in Washington" "a tragic one", was aware of the current political atmosphere, where the destruction of the careers of political opponents on the basis of accusations of homosexual behavior had become commonplace. In his 1964 defence of Walter Jenkins, he argued in the line of Lady Bird Johnson, who had thought about de-escalating the situation by attributing the purported offense to the exhaustion of a man who had temporarily overworked himself in the challenging time before the election. In advance to the FBI's investigation of the case, Pearson followed several leads that apparently proved that Jenkins had been framed. The journalist, whom Lyndson B. Johnson on another occasion had recommended as a thoroughly informed, critical expert of the Ku-Klux-Klan, let the president know what he had found out.

In October 1967, Drew Pearson once more exposed the hypocrisy of the allegations that had led to the removal of Walter Jenkins and other well experienced public servants. This time, it was two members of Governor of California Ronald Reagan's staff who had participated in an eight-man "sex orgy" at Lake Tahoe. Governor Reagan, who had been critical in the case of Walter Jenkins, hadn't taken action until six months later, when the "most able and highly qualified" men were fired: "He [Ronald Reagan] campaigned on the proposition that while he did not know much about Government he would surround himself with experts who did. Two of these experts have now turned out to be involved in conduct which society does not condone. Despite this, they were kept in the Governor's office for approximately six months and reportedly were only dropped when Reagan's right-wing backers demanded that they be fired, not because of their sex behavior, but because they were too moderate for the right wing."

In Pearson's view, the firing of the two members of Reagan's team on a pretext was part of a strategy to present the Governor and his actions in a more determined and impartial light: "The presence of homos in Government was first raised as an issue by a well known Republican, Sen. Joseph R. McCarthy, who claimed the State Department was riddled with them. Though he was not able to prove his claims, it remains a fact that a homosexual in the Defense or State Departments is automatically fired as a security risk. He can too easily be blackmailed. The reason why Reagan's press secretary is now belatedly explaining the facts behind the dropping of his two assistants may well be the desire to show that Ronnie acted quickly - which he did not do." Hoping to protect his aspirations for a presidential candidature, Pearson's article inclined, Governor Reagan had turned a blind eye to his own government's sex scandal and had acted in his very personal interests.

Engagement for democracy and peace 
Drew Pearson's engagement for democracy and peace started at an early age and lasted throughout his entire life. The best-known of his manyfold activities were::
 1919-1921: Volunteer for two years of service in Serbia  to supervise the American Friends Service Committee (forerunner of the Peace Corps) postwar relief program in Balkan villages
 Long-time president of the Washington D. C. chapter of Big Brothers, at the time a non-profit program with the concept of a One-Man-One-Boy relationship allowing to graduate potential delinquent boys into responsible citizenship
 Taking troupes of professional entertainers (e.g. the Harlem Globetrotters) for visits to American overseas bases at Christmas time
 1952 Organization of the committee "Americans Against Bombs of Bigotry", to take action against the bombing of schools and worship that had resulted from racial and religious intolerance
 1953 Organization of the "Americans Conscience Fund" for victims of racial bigotry
 Largely responsible for raising the money to rebuild the Clinton, Tennessee, schoolhouse, that two years after the 1596 desegregation had been destroyed by white supremacists

Following World War II, Drew Pearson with the support of his wife Luvie Pearson initiated the Friendship Train which on its way through the USA collected over 700 cars of food, clothing and fuel worth over $40 million in aid for "America's friends" in war-torn Europe: "Luvie was the steam that powered the train across the northern United States, and Drew fired up the southern route. Both stopped at every village for contributions. They collected enough food to fill 'two long freight trains.' And then they took it to Europe, with keys to the towns presented at every stop." On December 19, 1947, one day after the arrival of the much-needed food, medicine and supplies in France, Pearson was awarded the French Legion of Honor, rank of Chevalier, in recognition of his charitable engagement and work.

Some of his other international engagements for democracy and peace were:

 Organisation of the "Democracy Letters to Italy" in the election of 1948, to help defeat Communism in Italy in this election
 1951 he helped to launch the "Freedom Balloon" campaign, by which the Crusade for Freedom reached behind the Iron Curtain with messages of liberty and encouragement
 1953: Initiator of the "Food for East Germany" program (supported by the Eisenhower Administration)
 1959: Delegate to the Atlantic Conference (London)
 1961: Member of the "President's Food for Peace Committee"
 1961: Interviews with Chairman Khrushchev at his summer home on the Black Sea

Death and legacy 
At the time of Pearson's death of a heart attack in 1969 in Washington, D.C., the column was syndicated to more than 650 newspapers, more than twice as many as any other, with an estimated 60 million readers, and was famous for its investigative style of journalism. A Harris Poll commissioned by Time magazine at that time showed that Pearson was America's best-known newspaper columnist at the time of his death. The column was continued by Jack Anderson and then by Douglas Cohn and Eleanor Clift, who combine commentary with historical perspectives. It is the longest-running syndicated column in America.

American University Library received the typescript copies of the columns distributed to newspapers around the country in 1992.  Shortly thereafter, the Library embarked on a project to digitize the collection.

Personal life

Drew Pearson had one daughter, Ellen Cameron Pearson (1926–2010), in a short marriage (1925–28) to Felicia Gizycka, daughter of the newspaper heiress Cissy Patterson and Count Joseph Gizycky of Poland. Thereafter, Pearson maintained a strained relationship with his former mother-in-law, and they frequently exchanged barbed comments in print. His second wife was Luvie Moore Abell (a cousin of Edith Kermit Carow), whom he married in 1936; through that union he had a step son, Tyler Abell, to whom he was close throughout his life. Abell later became chief of protocol under President Lyndon B. Johnson.

Pearson died on September 1, 1969, at the age of 71 from the effects of a heart attack.

Tributes and recognition
"...  the voice of my friend Drew Pearson, has been stilled by death. It was a voice which was sometimes harsh with Members of this House and the institution of Congress. In fact four Members of Congress went to jail because of that voice. It may seem strange for a Congressman to praise such a voice and to mourn his silence, but I, for one, believe truth is more important than comfort, and exposure of that which is wrong-doing. Drew Pearson was not silent, and as gentle as he was in private life, he was equally as determined in his public role to expose those who had failed in their public duty. (...) Both the public and the private Drew Pearson will be missed. For many years he served as the conscience of America, and it is a tribute to him that a new breed of reporters has grown up to follow in his tradition. We will not have another Drew Pearson, but his works both public and private will live on as a lasting monument to the complex and vital man he was." (Don Edwards of California, Member of the U. S. House of Representatives)

"In public affairs and politics, Drew Pearson's brilliance, courage, and devotion to our system of constitutional self-government inspired millions of Americans throughout his great career. His acts of courage were countless. (...) His innumerable clashes with dishonest and corrupt officials at all levels of government demonstrated a courage rooted in sincerity, conscience, and conviction. The record of his service to his generation and all to follow is a significant part of this period of American history. (...) His contributions to the foreign affairs of our nation put us forever in his debt. In 1947, Drew Pearson helped symbolize the need for free nations to join in feeding a weakened Europe, by staging the Friendship Train. The Christian Science Monitor called it 'one of the greatest projects ever born of American journalism." (...) Democratic leaders of France and Italy stated that this meaningful, symbolic gesture in support of friendship helped in their contest with Communism." (Senator Wayne L. Morse, from Oregon)

"The spirit of Drew Pearson continues free in the land, as it has for so long, a free spirit seeking freedom for all." (Tyler Abell)

"Drew never ducked a battle, no matter how imposing the odds. When he felt he was right, he would take on Senators, Cabinet members, generals - often, even Presidents. He was a man of conviction who followed his conscience with a courage that is uncommon even among the bright, bold men who are America's top reporters. Drew was different in other was, too. Even while pursuing scoundrels in high places, he remained a gentle, compassionate man, never callous, never jaded. He was raised a Quaker, and his Quaker training - the sympathy for the underdog, the alert conscience, the pacifism - remained with him. (...) Above all else, however, he was a crusader. He passionately believed that public office was a public trust, and with his own brand of personal journalism, he went after the corrupt and the incompetent and the pompous. Yet even in the middle of his assaults on those he had found doing wrong, he felt enormous sympathy for them as human beings. The world knows that he helped to send more than a dozen corrupt Congressmen, tax chiselers and political fixers to jail. What the world doesn't know is that he quietly helped many of them to start a new life after they had paid their dept to society." (Jack Anderson, The Bell Syndicate Inc.)

"Few of the 50 million daily readers of 'Washington Merry-Go-Round' were non-committal about its principal author, Drew Pearson. Some considered him a talented practitioner of one of the loftiest forms of journalism - scourging the venal and corrupt in public life. Others abominated him as a skilled exponent of one of the basest forms of journalism - assassinating the character of selfless public servants through falsehood and distortion. Either was. Mr. Pearson was one of the country's most influential political columnists for more than 35 years. 'Nobody comes even close to competing with the Pearson product, which is a unique blend of ear-nival pitch, news, synthetic philosophy and rumor.' Robert G. Sherill, another Washington writer, said earlier this year." (Alden Whitman, New York Times)

"Drew Pearson was a muckraker with a Quaker Conscience. In print he sounded fierce. In life hew was gentle, even courtly. For 38 years he did more than any man to keep the national capital honest." (Chalmers M. Roberts, Washington Post)

Published works
Washington Merry-Go-Round (New York: Horace Liveright, 1931).
More Merry-Go-Round (1932) 
The American Diplomatic Game (New York: Doubleday, Doran & Co., 1935) 
U.S.A.: Second Class Power? (1958),
The Case Against Congress: a Compelling Indictment of Corruption on Capitol Hill (1958)
The Senator Doubleday (1968)
The President Doubleday (1970)
Diaries, 1949–1959 (New York: Holt, Rinehart and Winston, 1974),
Nine Old Men (American Constitutional and Legal History) with Robert Allen, (1974)  The Nine Old Men, Drew Pearson and Robert S. Allen, Doubleday, Doran & Company, Inc., 1937
Washington Merry-Go-Round: The Drew Pearson Diaries, 1960-1969, by Drew Pearson (Author), Peter Hannaford (Editor), Richard Norton Smith (Foreword), September 15, 2015 , University of Nebraska Press.

Awards and recognition
Pearson was awarded Norway's Medal of St. Olav, the French Legion of Honour, the Order of the Star of Italian Solidarity, and two honorary degrees. He also was given a star on the Hollywood Walk of Fame for "The Drew Pearson Show", an early program of current events.

Character actor Robert F. Simon played Pearson in the 1977 NBC television movie Tail Gunner Joe, a biopic of U.S. Senator Joseph R. McCarthy of Wisconsin.

Quotes
"I just operate with a sense of smell: if something smells wrong, I go to work."

See also

Profiles in Courage, section: Authorship
Edward R. Murrow

References

Further reading

External links
 

 Drew Pearson, Biography (Encyclopædia Britannica)
 "Washington Merry-Go-Round" from 1932 to 1960 online.
 WNYC: 1947 Drew Pearson's address to the children and people of America (Friendship train in New York City)
 Video: The Friendship Train 1947
 Drew Pearson interviewed by Mike Wallace on The Mike Wallace Interview December 7, 1957
 Oral History Interview with Drew Pearson, from the Lyndon Baines Johnson Library
 Tyler Abell interview on C-SPAN in 2015 on the occasion of the release of Washington Merry-Go-Round: The Drew Pearson Diaries, 1960-1969
 Drew Pearson Collection, American University, Washington, DC
 Various Drew Pearson Collections, National Archives, Washington, DC
 

1897 births
1969 deaths
American broadcast news analysts
American columnists
American male journalists
American radio journalists
Recipients of the Legion of Honour
The Washington Post columnists
The Baltimore Sun people
20th-century American non-fiction writers
20th-century American male writers
Writers from Evanston, Illinois
Phillips Exeter Academy alumni
Swarthmore College alumni
University of Pennsylvania faculty
Columbia University faculty